This is a list of years in Bhutan. See also the timeline of Bhutanese history.  For only articles about years in Bhutan that have been written, see :Category:Years in Bhutan.

Twenty-first century

Twentieth century

Nineteenth century

Eighteenth century

See also 

 
Years
Bhutan